Richard G. Gannon (born July 29, 1950) is an American former politician who served in the Kansas State Senate as a Democrat from 1977 to 1988.

References

1950 births
Living people
Democratic Party Kansas state senators
People from Goodland, Kansas
20th-century American politicians